Moses C. Hanscom (1842 - July 26, 1873) was a Union Army soldier in the American Civil War who received the U.S. military's highest decoration, the Medal of Honor.

Hanscom was born in 1842 in Danville, Maine and entered service at Bowdoinham, Maine. He was awarded the Medal of Honor, for extraordinary heroism shown on October 14, 1863, at the Battle of Bristoe Station, while serving as a Corporal with Company F, 19th Maine Volunteer Infantry Regiment. His Medal of Honor was issued on December 1, 1864, and is on display at the Maine State Museum.

Hanscom died at the age of 30, on July 26, 1873, and was buried at Oak Hill Cemetery in Auburn, Maine.

Medal of Honor citation

See also

 Battle of Bristoe Station
 Battle of Gettysburg
19th Maine Volunteer Infantry Regiment

References

Bibliography

 Civilwarhome - Gettysburg Union order of battle
 Civil War Trust - Gettysburg Union order of battle
 
 
 Eicher, John H. "Gettysburg Order of Battle" at Gettysburg Discussion Group website.
 Gettysburg Discussion Group - Union order of battle
 Gettysburg National Military Park - The Army of the Potomac at Gettysburg
 .

 U.S. War Department, The War of the Rebellion: a Compilation of the Official Records of the Union and Confederate Armies. Washington, D.C.: U.S. Government Printing Office, 1880–1901.

External links

1842 births
1873 deaths
Burials in Maine
People of Maine in the American Civil War
Union Army soldiers
United States Army Medal of Honor recipients
American Civil War recipients of the Medal of Honor
People from Auburn, Maine